Barg may refer to
 Barg, Iran, a village in Razavi Khorasan Province, Iran
 Barg, South Khorasan, a village in South Khorasan Province, Iran
 Kabab Barg, Persian-style barbecued lamb, chicken or beef kebab
 Barg, a unit of gauge pressure, i.e. pressure in bars above ambient or atmospheric pressure; see Bar (unit)#Absolute pressure and gauge pressure

People with the surname
 Thorsten Barg (born 1986), German football player
 Benjamin Barg (born 1984), German football player

See also
 Barag (disambiguation)
 Berg (disambiguation)
 Birg (disambiguation)
 Borg (disambiguation)
 Burg (disambiguation)